The Walking Dead franchise is an American zombie apocalypse media franchise and a shared universe that is centered on a number of interconnected television series based on the comic book of the same name. Set in the fictional universe, the franchise has developed with crossover plot elements, settings, and characters that span four live-action television series, with three additional live-action television series in various stages of production, as well as eight live-action web series that tie in to the first two television series. The series aired on AMC and AMC+. 

The comic book was adapted into the first television series, which debuted in October 2010. It was followed by Fear the Walking Dead in 2015. The franchise further expanded in 2020 with a new spin-off series titled The Walking Dead: World Beyond, and an anthology series titled Tales of the Walking Dead in 2022. By 2022, three new spin-offs were announced for main The Walking Dead characters: The Walking Dead: Dead City focusing on Negan and Maggie, The Walking Dead: Daryl Dixon focusing on Daryl, and an untitled Rick and Michonne spin-off series that was originally a trilogy of scrapped films.

Actors who have appeared in multiple series and web series include Andrew Lincoln, Lennie James, Melissa McBride, Tom Payne, Pollyanna McIntosh, Austin Amelio, Christine Evangelista, Noah Emmerich, Michelle Ang, Brendan Meyer, Nick Stahl, Maggie Grace, John Glover, Jeff Kober, Scarlett Blum, and Samantha Morton.

Development
In January 2010, AMC ordered a pilot for The Walking Dead, based on the comic book of the same name and developed by Frank Darabont and Gale Anne Hurd. Andrew Lincoln was cast as Rick Grimes. In September 2013, it was announced that Robert Kirkman, creator of the original comic book, Hurd, and Dave Alpert would be creating a companion spin-off television series featuring a new set of characters, later titled as Fear the Walking Dead. The series would then shift focus from being a prequel to run concurrently with the original series by having Lennie James being promoted to the main cast of Fear, reprising his role as Morgan Jones, after being a guest star on the original series thus also marking the first crossover within the franchise. The second crossover was Austin Amelio reprising his role as the reformed Saviour Dwight in the fifth season.

In July 2018, Scott M. Gimple announced a second spin-off series at San Diego Comic-Con which was later given a 10-episode order and the working title Monument before being revealed as The Walking Dead: World Beyond which would only run for two seasons. The second season featured the franchise's third crossover with Pollyanna McIntosh reprising her role as Jadis from The Walking Dead. In November, Gimple announced that a trilogy of The Walking Dead films, revolving around Rick with Lincoln reprising his role, were in development by AMC Original Films. James expressed interest in joining the film while McIntosh had teased her character Jadis in being in the film. 

In September 2020, an antology series was announced from Gimple which was greenlit October 2021, and titled Tales of the Walking Dead which would focus on new and old characters. Throughout 2022, multiple projects were announced or reworked such as The Walking Dead: Dead City, the first of the few spin-offs coming out in 2023 focusing on Maggie Greene and Negan and was originally titled Isle of the Dead; Daryl Dixon, originally a spin-off about the titular character and Carol Peletier which shifted focus to Daryl due to logistical reasons by the latter's actor Melissa McBride; and an untitled Rick and Michonne series that was originally the trilogy of films announced in 2019 that was reworked into a miniseries. In an interview with AMC, Gimple said that these spin-offs are some of many to come and that they are working on more limited series and spin-offs but aren't as urgent right now.

Television series

The Walking Dead (2010–2022)

Sheriff's deputy Rick Grimes wakes up from a coma in a post-apocalyptic world where the undead, known as walkers, have taken over. Rick must fight for his survival to protect his family and friends while  along the way he meets new allies and confronts enemies who try to take over communities. With the collapse of modern civilization, these survivors must confront other human survivors who have formed groups and communities with their own sets of laws and morals, sometimes leading to open, hostile conflict between them.

Fear the Walking Dead (2015–present)

Set initially in Los Angeles, California, the series follows a dysfunctional blended family composed of high school guidance counselor Madison Clark, her boyfriend and English teacher Travis Manawa, her daughter Alicia, and her drug-addicted son Nick, at the onset of the zombie apocalypse. The four must either revamp themselves or cling to their deep flaws as they come to terms with the impending collapse of civilization.

World Beyond (2020–2021)

Four teenagers, who have grown up in a generation ten years into the zombie apocalypse, navigate themselves outside of their community known as the Campus Colony leading them to paths where they will either become heroes or villains.

Tales of the Walking Dead (2022–present)

An episodic anthology series set in The Walking Dead universe featuring stories of new and old characters.

Dead City

Maggie and Negan find themselves in a post-apocalyptic New York City where its residents have made the city their own world of anarchy, danger, beauty, and terror.

Daryl Dixon

Daryl Dixon investigates how he got to France and tries to piece together what happened and how he will get back home.

Untitled Rick and Michonne series

The series will take place after the events of the fifth episode of the ninth season, "What Comes After" and the thirteenth episode of the tenth season "What We Become", and presents an "epic love story of two characters changed by a changed world."

Web series

Recurring cast and characters

Other media

Board games

Multiple board games for the franchise have been released. 
 Cryptozoic Entertainment has released two board games based on the TV show: 
 The Walking Dead Board Game (2011)
 The Walking Dead Board Game: Best Defense was released in 2013, as well as an expansion
 Keith Tralins, Brian-David Marshall, and Matthew Wang have released two games based on the comic:
 Robert Kirkman's The Walking Dead: The Board Game (2011), released by Z-Man Games
 The Walking Dead: The Prison (November 2014), released  by Alliance Game Distributors
 A The Walking Game version of Monopoly has been released
 A The Walking Game version of Risk has been released
 In 2018, Mantic Games released a boardgame version of their miniature game All Out war focused on Negan

Card games
 Cryptozoic released The Walking Dead Card Game in 2013.

Miniatures games 
 In January 2016, Mantic Games announced plans to release a tabletop miniature wargame (skirmish) based on The Walking Dead
 In 2019, Mantic Games launched a new version of their miniature game rules focused on larger battles, named The Walking Dead: Call To Arms. This game uses the same miniatures as The Walking Dead: All Out War.

Video games
 The Walking Dead: From Telltale Games, the game is set within the comic book universe.
 The Walking Dead: Social Game: Flash based social game on Facebook, launched in 2012 and shut down at the end of 2014.
 Survival Instinct: On July 6, 2012, Activision announced a first-person shooter based on and set before the television series, which is being developed by Terminal Reality. It was released on March 19, 2013, in North America. It was met with negative reception.
 The Walking Dead: Dead Reckoning: Game for the AMC website and set before the television series.
 The Walking Dead: Road to Survival: The Walking Dead: Road to Survival is a role-playing video game developed by Scopely based on the comic book series. It was released initially on the Android platform, later on iOS. Players complete various missions using teams, in exchange for further rewards, and more challenging stages.
 The Walking Dead: No Man's Land: Game for Android/iOS.
 The Walking Dead: Our World: Location-based mobile game. Set in The Walking Dead universe and developed by Next Games.
 The Escapists: The Walking Dead: The Escapists: The Walking Dead is a spin-off from The Escapists, a strategy video game about escaping prisons.
 Overkill's The Walking Dead: In August 2014, Starbreeze Studios announced that a The Walking Dead co-op first-person shooter is in development by Overkill Software. The game is called Overkill's The Walking Dead, and it claims to deliver a "completely new co-op experience" to The Walking Dead universe that will explore new characters and storylines. It was scheduled to launch on Xbox One, PlayStation 4, and Microsoft Windows in 2018. The game is being made with The Walking Dead creator Robert Kirkman, who says he was certain from the first day he saw the project that it was the "co-op action game fans have been waiting for." It is also the result of a new "long-term" partnership between Starbreeze and Kirkman's company Skybound Interactive. This partnership will extend "into the next decade" and marks a new era for Starbreeze, the company said. It is takes place within the comic book universe of The Walking Dead.
 The Walking Dead: Saints & Sinners: A virtual reality game developed by Skybound Entertainment. It was released on January 23, 2020.
 The Walking Dead: Onslaught: A VR game for AMC's The Walking Dead.
 The Walking Dead: Last Mile: A live, interactive, online experience and game on Facebook Instant Gaming. It was released on August 22, 2022.
 The Walking Dead: Saints & Sinners – Chapter 2: Retribution: A sequel was released for Meta Quest 2 on December 1, 2022, and for PlayStation VR and PlayStation VR2 in 2023.

Novels
Novels for The Walking Dead set within the comic book universe.

Miscellaneous
McFarlane Toys manufactured action figures resembling the characters in the comic book for September 2011 release. In addition, action figures resembling characters from the TV series, including Rick Grimes, Daryl Dixon, and a dismemberable "walker", were set for release in November 2011.
Taverncraft has produced The Walking Dead pint glasses and steins, and has a license to release lighters for the series as well.
Titan Magazines has published The Walking Dead, The Official Magazine since October 2012.
Vannen Watches has produced two limited edition wrist watches featuring artwork from Charlie Adlard. The first watch was released February 2012, and came with packaging that was hand-signed by Robert Kirkman and Charlie Adlard. The second watch was released June 2012, and came with packaging signed only by Robert Kirkman.
 Two pinball tables based on the series were released: a physical table developed by Stern Pinball and a virtual one developed and published by Zen Studios, based on Telltale Games' The Walking Dead: Season One.

Attractions
 The Walking Dead: The Ride: Located in Thorpe Park, Thorpe, United Kingdom, The Ride is a re-design of a previously standing ride. Opened as The Walking Dead: The Ride in March 2018, as part of the "Year of The Walking Dead". The rides slogan is "Those who ride, survive".

References

External links
  at AMC

 
Television franchises
AMC Networks
Image Comics